Several units of the Royal Canadian Navy have been named HMCS Granby.

 , a Bangor-class minesweeper that served during the Second World War and in the Cold War, given the new pennant number FSE 180.
 HMCS Granby (FSE 180), the former Prestonian-class frigate Victoriaville which assumed the name and duties of the first Granby.

Battle honours

 Atlantic, 1942–44

References

 Government of Canada Ships' Histories - HMCS Granby

Royal Canadian Navy ship names